Curragh (Mechum) is a townland in Athlone, County Westmeath, Ireland. The townland is in the civil parish of St. Mary's.

The townland stands near the centre of the town, to the east of the Athlone railway station. A section of the Athlone to Mullingar Cycleway is located in the north of the townland.

References 

Townlands of County Westmeath